Raphaël Michel Hamburger (born 2 April 1981) is a French producer and a soundtrack music supervisor.

Career 
After studying sound engineering, Hamburger produced albums for several French artists, including the pop-rocke singer Adrienne Pauly, the rapper and beatboxer Spleen, HollySiz, June&Ours and Polo & Pan. He participated in the French version of Sean Lennon's song "Parachute", called "L'Éclipse" (The eclipse), with Mathieu Chedid, and founded Hamburger Records, Radiooooo, with Kolkoz artist Benjamin Moreau, Chi-Fou-Mi Records and MMM agency, with Schmooze music supervision and sound production company founder, Matthieu Sibony.

In 2016, Hamburger produced the Ritz Bar compilation. He bought the former Studios Acousti, rebaptised Studios Saint-Germain, directed by Élodie Filleul.

In 2018,  37 female singers (including Brigitte, Mayra Andrade, Anaïs Croze, Clara Luciani, Sandra Nkaké, Elisa Tovati, Agnès Jaoui, Olivia Ruiz, La Grande Sophie, Superbus, Elodie Frégé, Inna Modja, Mai Lan and Julie Zenatti) recorded the new version of the anthem of the Mouvement de libération des femmes.

In 2019, for the first anniversary of Hamburger's mother's death, Mathieu Chedid dedicated a song, Un autre paradis, to Hamburger that appeared on the album Lettre infinie.

In 2020, Hamburger was prepared to produce Starmania at the Seine Musicale of Boulogne-Billancourt, canceled in 2021 and in 2022 due to COVID-19 pandemic.

From 2016 to 2020, Hamburger managed a Spa, SkySpa (Laddaparis).

In 2022, Hamburger's personal adaptation of Starmania faced strong backlash, receiving severe criticism: beginnings "timid, murmuring", "strangely false", "inexperienced", "nearly kitsch and vintage". Vanity Fair said that the sound was too loud and the light dangerous for photo-sensitive people. The costumes of Nicolas Ghesquière "do not say anything", and the political dimension is "erased for love stories", "programmed for the Instagram generation", with "a certain coldness and a lack of vocal projection", and too many "slapped basses" and "dumb" arrangements with a "1990s funk-rock" sauce, songs that have aged badly, a cold first part, and slow and a backfiring second act.

Personal life 
Hamburger is the son of French singers Michel Berger and France Gall, the grandson of French physician, surgeon and essayist Jean Hamburger, the great-grandson of the co-founder of Manécanterie des Petits Chanteurs à la Croix de Bois, Paul Berthier, and godson of French stand-up comedian and actor Coluche.

Known as a difficult teenager, Hamburger was severely injured in a scooter accident at a young age and almost died. After his sister Pauline died on 15 December 1997 from cystic fibrosis, he went through an acrimonious trial in June 1998 against his aunt and his father's former companion, Véronique Sanson, because he wanted to transfer Pauline's remains to be next to their father's in a closed vault in the Montmartre Cemetery. After the 26 October hearing, and a failed mediation on 11 January 1999, there were new hearings on 31 May and 28 June. On 4 October the Tribunal de grande instance de Paris gave the order to transfer Berger's remains next to his daughter's.

Hamburger is a regular poker player and the father of Ella, born in 2021.

Filmography

Film
 2012: Maniac
 2012: Nous York
 2012: Comme des frères
 2012: Asterix and Obelix: God Save Britannia
 2013: The Gilded Cage
 2013: The Past
 2013: Blood Ties
 2014: Grace of Monaco
 2014: La Crème de la crème
 2014: The Search
 2014: Colt 45
 2014: Eden
 2014: Le père Noël
 2015: La Résistance de l'air
 2015: Nos femmes
 2015: Un moment d'égarement 
 2015: Tout, tout de suite
 2015: Desierto
 2016 : Two Is a Family
 2016 : Things to Come
 2016 : The Jews
 2016 : Open at Night
 2017 : Redoutable
 2018 : Maya
 2021 : Bergman Island
 2021 : Annette

Television 
 2013: Casting(s) (15 episodes)

Short film 
 2014: Quelques secondes (producer)
 2014: Hybris (music supervisor)

Awards 
 2014: Best French short film at Festival du film court de Nyon for Hybris

Bibliography
Quelque chose en nous de Michel Berger. Yves Bigot, Editions Don Quichotte, 2012
Dictionnaire étonnant des célébrités. Jean-Louis Beaucarnot, Frédéric Dumoulin, Editions First, 2015

References

External links

French musicians
French film producers
1981 births
Artists from Paris
Living people
People from Boulogne-Billancourt
French people of Swiss-Jewish descent
French poker players
Lycée Fénelon Sainte-Marie alumni